See My Lawyer is a 1921 American silent comedy film directed by Al Christie and starring T. Roy Barnes, Grace Darmond and Lloyd Whitlock. It is based on the 1915 play See My Lawyer by Max Marcin.

Synopsis
An inventor fraudulently claims to have designed a machine that produces artificial rubber.

Cast
 T. Roy Barnes as Robert Gardner
 Grace Darmond as Norma Joyce
 Lloyd Whitlock as Billy Noble
 Jean Acker as 	Betty Gardner
 Ogden Crane as 	T. Hamilton Brown
 Tom McGuire as Leonard D. Robinson
 J.P. Lockney as Otto Trueman
 Lincoln Plumer as 	Anson Morse
 Bert Woodruff as 	Dr. Drew
 Eugenie Forde as Aunt Kate

References

Bibliography
 Munden, Kenneth White. The American Film Institute Catalog of Motion Pictures Produced in the United States, Part 1. University of California Press, 1997.

External links
 

1920s American films
1921 films
1921 comedy films
1920s English-language films
American silent feature films
Silent American comedy films
American black-and-white films
Films directed by Al Christie
Film Booking Offices of America films
American films based on plays